Syktyvdinsky District (Syktyvdïn rajon) is an administrative district (raion), one of the twelve in the Komi Republic, Russia. It is located in the south of the republic. Its administrative center is the rural locality (a selo) of Vylgort. As of the 2010 Census, the total population of the district was 22,660, with the population of Vylgort accounting for 45.4% of that number.

Administrative and municipal status
Within the framework of administrative divisions, Syktyvdinsky District is one of the twelve in the Komi Republic. The district is divided into ten selo administrative territories and three settlement administrative territories, which comprise forty-nine rural localities. As a municipal division, the district is incorporated as Syktyvdinsky Municipal District. Its thirteen administrative territories are incorporated as thirteen rural settlements within the municipal district. The selo of Vylgort serves as the administrative center of both the administrative and municipal district.

References

Notes

Sources

Districts of the Komi Republic
